Ali-Sabieh Airport  is an airport serving the city of Ali-Sabieh in the Ali Sabieh Region of Djibouti.

References

External links

Airports in Djibouti